Kerwin is a surname. Notable individuals with this surname are listed below.
"Kerwin" can also be a given name, such as in Kerwin Smith.

Ashley Kerwin, fictional character in Degrassi: The Next Generation
Brian Kerwin, American actor
Claire Kerwin, Belgian-born Canadian artist
Cornelius M. Kerwin, American educator
Irene Kerwin, All-American Girls Professional Baseball League player
James Kerwin, American film and theater director
James C. Kerwin, American jurist
John Kerwin, American talk-show host
Joe Kerwin, College lacrosse coach
Joseph P. Kerwin, American astronaut
Lance Kerwin, American actor
Larkin Kerwin, Canadian physicist
Mary Ann Kerwin, American breastfeeding activist and co-founder of La Leche League
Patrick Kerwin, Canadian judge
Tom Kerwin, American basketball player
Walter T. Kerwin, Jr., American general

Surnames of Irish origin